The Order of the White Double Cross is the highest state decoration of the Slovak Republic.

The Order was instituted on 1 March 1994 after Slovakia became independent on 1 January 1993. It continues the Czechoslovak Order of the White Lion, which was created in 1922 as an award for foreigners.

The Order of the White Double Cross is conferred only upon foreign citizens, with the sole exception of the current President of Slovakia, who is awarded the Order by the National Council for the duration of their term of office upon inauguration.

According to the Order's statute, it is awarded:
 "for the comprehensive development of relations between the state, whose citizens they are and the Slovak Republic";
 "for the empowerment of the Slovak Republic’s position in international relations";
 "for meeting the foreign policy priorities of Slovakia";
 "for otherwise outstanding achievement in the benefit of the Slovak Republic"; or
 "for the outstanding spread of good reputation of Slovakia abroad."

Classes
The Order of the White Double Cross has two divisions, civil and military, and three classes:
 First Class or Grand Cross – badge may be worn on a sash on the right shoulder, plus the star is worn on the left chest;
 Second Class or Grand Officer – badge may be worn on a necklet and the star is worn on the left chest;
 Third Class or Commander – badge may be worn on a necklet.

Insignia
The star is an eight-pointed gold breast star, with golden straight rays between the points of the star. The central disc on the star has a white double cross on a red enamel background, which is surrounded by a gold wreath of laurel and oak leaves.

The badge of the Order is of the same design as the star, although smaller. Furthermore, the upper point is missing and the badge is suspended on a stylized leaf of a common lime tree, with or without the crossed swords of the Military Division.

The ribbon of the order is blue with a red central stripe.

Recipients

 Grand Crosses
 Askar Akayev
 Beatrix of the Netherlands
 Andrew Bertie
 Fernando Henrique Cardoso
 Carl XVI Gustaf
 Carlo Azeglio Ciampi
 Emil Constantinescu
 Janez Drnovšek
 Elizabeth II
 Ivan Gašparovič
 Joachim Gauck
 Árpád Göncz
 Tarja Halonen
 Harald V of Norway
 Václav Havel
 Henri, Grand Duke of Luxembourg
 Henrik, Prince Consort of Denmark
 Jaap de Hoop Scheffer
 François Hollande
 Milada Horáková
 Ion Iliescu
 Don Johnston
 Juan Carlos I of Spain
 Lech Kaczynski
 Thomas Klestil
 Bronisław Komorowski
 Franz König
 Michal Kováč
 Milan Kučan
 Aleksander Kwasniewski
 Émile Lahoud
 Ricardo Lagos
 Margrethe II of Denmark
 Stjepan Mesic
 Giorgio Napolitano
 Nursultan Nazarbayev
 Tassos Papadopoulos
 Heliodor Píka
 Johannes Rau
 Fernando de la Rúa
 Arnold Rüütel
 Juan Antonio Samaranch
 Jorge Sampaio
 Oscar Luigi Scalfaro
 Angelo Sodano
 Queen Sofía of Spain
 Frank-Walter Steinmeier
 Koloman Sokol
 Konstantinos Stephanopoulos
 Petar Stoyanov
 Jozef Tomko
 Alexander Van der Bellen
 Max van der Stoel
 Günter Verheugen
 Rudolf Vrba
 Miloš Zeman
 Willem-Alexander of the Netherlands
 Queen Máxima of the Netherlands
 Grand Officers
 Ruzena Bajcsy
 Catherine Ashton
 Wladyslaw Bartoszewski
 Albrecht von Boeselager
 Gene Cernan
 Guillaume, Hereditary Grand Duke of Luxembourg
 Ludwig Hoffmann-Rumerstein
 Marta Kubišová
 Štefan Osuský
 Petr Pithart
 Herman Van Rompuy
 Commanders
 Jacek Baluch
 Gabriela Beňačková
 Sir Derek Bowett
 Viktor Fainberg
 David O'Keeffe
 Ryszard Siwiec

External links
 President of the Slovak Republic official website
 State Honours, Orders & Decorations – website of the Slovak Republic (archived)

Orders, decorations, and medals of Slovakia
Awards established in 1994
White Double Cross, Order of the
1994 establishments in Slovakia